Sotto il Monte ("Under the Mountain"), officially Sotto il Monte Giovanni XXIII, is a comune in northern Italy. Located in the Province of Bergamo in the Region of Lombardy, the town's official name, much like that of Riese Pio X, commemorates the town's most famous son: Angelo Giuseppe Roncalli, who later became Pope John XXIII.

Twin towns — sister cities
Sotto il Monte Giovanni XXIII is twinned with:

  Marktl, Germany (2009)

References